There are differences from one country to another regarding the definition of Japanese war crimes. War crimes have been broadly defined as violations of the laws or customs of war, which include crimes against either enemy combatants or enemy non-combatants. War crimes also included deliberate attacks on citizens and property of neutral states as they fall under the category of non-combatants, as at the attack on Pearl Harbor. Military personnel from the Empire of Japan have been accused and/or convicted of committing many such acts during the period of Japanese imperialism from the late 19th to mid-20th centuries. They have been accused of conducting a series of human rights abuses against civilians and prisoners of war (POWs) throughout east Asia and the western Pacific region. These events reached their height during the Second Sino-Japanese War of 1937–45 and the Asian and Pacific campaigns of World War II (1941–45).

In Japan itself, the description of particular events as war crimes — and specific details of these events — are often disputed by Japanese nationalists, such as Tsukurukai (Society for History Textbook Reform). Such organisations and their activities are a subject of controversy and are alleged to be examples of historical revisionism.

International law
Although the 1929 Geneva Convention on Prisoners of War provided the regulations how prisoners of war should be treated, the Empire of Japan never signed the agreement (except the 1929 Geneva Convention on the Sick and Wounded). However, many of the alleged crimes committed by imperial personnel were also violations of the Japanese code of military law, which Japanese authorities either ignored or failed to enforce. The empire also violated provisions of the Treaty of Versailles, such as article 171, which outlawed the use of poison gas (chemical weapons), and other international agreements signed by Japan, such as the Hague Conventions of 1899 and 1907, which protect prisoners of war (POWs). According to historian Akira Fujiwara, Hirohito personally ratified on 5 August 1937 a proposition by his Army chief of staff, Prince Kan'in Kotohito , to remove the constraint of those conventions on the treatment of Chinese prisoners.

Japan and international treaties

In Japan, the term "Japanese war crimes" generally refers to cases tried by the International Military Tribunal for the Far East, also known as the Tokyo Trials, following the end of the Pacific War. The tribunal did not prosecute war crimes allegations involving mid-ranking officers or more junior personnel. Those were dealt with separately in other cities throughout the Asia-Pacific region.

The Japanese government said that Japan was not a signatory to the 1929 Geneva Convention on Prisoners of War, although it was the signatory of the 1907 Hague Convention, which provided humane treatment of prisoners of war (POWs), and the 1929 Geneva Convention on the Sick and Wounded Armed Forces in the Field, which provided humane treatment for enemy combatants who were injured, sick, or any other causes in the battlefield. It also signed the Kellogg-Briand Pact in 1929, thereby rendering its actions in 1937–45 liable to charges of crimes against peace, a charge which was introduced at the Tokyo Trials to prosecute Class-A War Criminals. (Class-B War Criminals are those found guilty of war crimes per se, and Class-C War Criminals are those guilty of crimes against humanity.) However, any convictions for such crimes are not required to be recognized by the Japanese government, as the Kellogg-Briand Pact did not have an enforcement clause stipulating penalties in the event of violation.

The Japanese government accepted the terms set by the Potsdam Declaration (1945) after the end of the war. The declaration alluded, in Article 10, to two kinds of war crime: one was the violation of international laws, such as the abuse of prisoners of war (POWs); the other was obstructing "democratic tendencies among the Japanese people" and civil liberties within Japan.

Japanese law
Japanese law does not recognize those convicted in the Tokyo Trials and other trials as criminals, despite the fact that Japan's governments have accepted the judgments made in the trials and in the Treaty of San Francisco (1952). This is because the treaty does not mention the legal validity of the tribunal. In the Japanese text, the word used for "accept" is judaku, as opposed to the stronger shounin ("to approve"). Those convicted have had no ability, under Japanese law, to appeal, as the Tokyo Tribunal and other war crimes courts have no standing in Japanese law. Under normal circumstances, it violates a number of fundamental principles of modern legal procedure to punish someone whose crime and penalty were defined only after the fact. Had Japan certified the legal validity of the war crimes tribunals in the San Francisco Treaty, this might have resulted in Japanese courts reversing such verdicts. Any such outcomes would have created domestic political crises and would have been unacceptable in international diplomatic circles.

The current Japanese jurists' consensus regarding the legal standing of the Tokyo tribunal is that, as a condition of ending the war, the Allies demanded a number of conditions including the execution and/or incarceration of those whom they deemed to be responsible for the war. These people were defined as guilty by a tribunal organized by the Allies. The Japanese government accepted these demands in the Potsdam Declaration and then accepted the actual sentencing in the San Francisco Treaty, which officially ended the state of war between Japan and the Allies. Although the penalties for the convicted, including execution, can be regarded as a violation of their technical legal rights, the constitution allowed such violations if proper legal procedure was followed, in the general public interest. Therefore, any such execution and/or incarceration is constitutionally valid, but has no relationship to Japanese criminal law. Hence those convicted as war criminals are not defined as criminals in Japan, although their execution and incarceration is regarded as legally valid.

International definitions 
Outside Japan, different societies use widely different timeframes in defining Japanese war crimes. For example, the annexation of Korea by Japan in 1910 was followed by the abolition of the traditional class system by Joseon and modernization against the Korean people. Thus, some Koreans refer to "Japanese war crimes" as events occurring during the period shortly prior to 1910 to 1945. Events such as the March 1st movement where 7,000 people were killed and the murder of Empress Myeongseong are considered war crimes in Korea. By comparison, the United States did not come into military conflict with Japan until 1941, and thus Americans may consider "Japanese war crimes" as encompassing only those events that occurred from 1941 to 1945.

A complicating factor is that a minority of people in every Asian and Pacific country invaded by Japan collaborated with the Japanese military, or even served in it, for a wide variety of reasons, such as economic hardship, coercion, or antipathy to other imperialist powers. Many Koreans served in the Imperial armed forces. The Formosan Army, which was part of the Imperial Japanese Army, was recruited from ethnic Chinese men on Formosa. The Indian National Army, under Subhas Chandra Bose, is perhaps the best-known example of a movement opposed to European imperialism, which was formed during World War II to assist the Japanese military. Prominent individual nationalists in other countries, such as the later Indonesian president, Suharto, also served with Japanese imperial forces. The Burmese nationalist leader Aung San initially sided with the Japanese, forming the Burma National Army, but turned against them in early 1945. In some cases such non-Japanese personnel were also responsible for war crimes committed by the Empire of Japan. B. V. A. Roling, the Dutch justice at the Tokyo trials, noted how "many of the commanders and guards in POW camps were Koreans [as] the Japanese apparently did not trust them as soldiers."  Korean guards, he added, were often said to be "far more cruel than the Japanese." One Korean described abject Allied POWs: "now I have seen how depraved and worthless the white man is." For political reasons, many non-Japanese personnel in the Imperial armed forces were never investigated or tried after 1945. In South Korea especially, it is alleged that such people were often able to acquire wealth by participating in exploitative activities with the Japanese military. It is further alleged in South Korea that some former collaborators have covered up "Japanese" war crimes in order to avoid their own prosecution and/or exposure.

It has been argued that acts committed against people subject to Japanese sovereignty cannot be considered "war crimes". The issue of Japan's de facto or de jure sovereignty over places such as Ryukyu (1879–1945), Taiwan (1895–1945), and Korea (1910–1945) prior to 1945, is a matter of controversy. Japanese control was accepted and recognized internationally and was justified by instruments such as the Treaty of Shimonoseki (1895, which included China's cession of Taiwan) and the Japan–Korea Annexation Treaty (1910). The legality of the Japan–Korea Annexation Treaty, in particular, is in question because it was not signed by the Korean head of state; it was signed by government ministers. The native populations were not consulted on the changes in sovereignty, nor was there universal acceptance of such annexations. There was ongoing resistance to Japanese invasions and — in any case — war crimes may also be committed during civil wars. (See Korea under Japanese rule and Taiwan under Japanese rule for further details.)

There are also allegations that war crimes were committed even after the Empire of Japan officially surrendered on August 14, 1945. For instance, it is believed that Allied prisoners of war who survived the Sandakan Death Marches, in North Borneo, were killed up to two weeks after the Emperor signed the surrender document.

Notes

References 

Japanese war crimes
 Defin
Historiography of Japan
Military historiography
Historical negationism
Military history of Japan
Imperial Japanese Army